The 2008 Wyoming Republican presidential caucuses took place on January 5, 2008, with 12 national delegates chosen by county convention delegates. A majority of the national delegates were won by former Massachusetts Governor Mitt Romney. In addition, two national delegates were elected at the Republican State Convention on May 30–31.

Eligible voters included precinct committee chairs (one man and one woman for each of the 487 precincts, which were elected in 2006) and 250 county convention delegates, elected in precinct caucuses held throughout Wyoming in December 2007 and apportioned according to Republican voters in the last congressional election.

Although originally the size of the delegation was 28, RNC rules stated that any states holding primary contests before February 5 would lose half of their delegates.

Results
Each of the 23 counties elected either a delegate or an alternate delegate, except for Laramie County, which elected both a delegate and an alternate delegate.

Results by County

The Wyoming Republican Party did not release the vote totals.

See also
 2008 Republican Party presidential primaries
 2008 Wyoming Democratic presidential caucuses

References

External links
Wyoming Republican Party Official Website

Wyoming
2008 Wyoming elections
2008